Oleksiy Shubin is a Ukrainian retired footballer.

Career
Oleksiy Shubin, started his career with Rechitsa-2014 in 1993 in Belarus, where he played 14 matches and then 15 matches in 1994. In 1995 he moved to Torpedo Zaporizhzhia where he stayed until 1998 where he played 60 matches. In 1998 he moved to FC Cherkasy playing 14 matches and 13 matches with Metalurg Nikopol. In 1999 he returned to FC Cherkasy until 2001 where he played 51 matches and then he moved to Naftovyk Okhtyrka, where he played 11 matches. In 2004 he moved to Desna Chernihivl, the club in the city of Chernihiv where he played 9 matches and he managed to play 12 matches and got second place in Ukrainian Second League in the season 2004–05.

Honours
Desna Chernihiv
 Ukrainian Second League: Runner-Up 2004–05

References

External links 
 
 Oleksiy Shubin allplayers.in.ua

1975 births
Living people
FC Desna Chernihiv players
FC Rechitsa-2014 players
FC Elektrometalurh-NZF Nikopol players
FC Naftovyk-Ukrnafta Okhtyrka players
FC Dnipro Cherkasy players
FC Torpedo Zaporizhzhia players
Ukrainian footballers
Ukrainian Premier League players
Ukrainian First League players
Ukrainian Second League players
Ukrainian expatriate sportspeople in Belarus
Expatriate footballers in Belarus
Association football defenders